Golfamania is a golf sports video game released for the Sega Master System in Europe and Brazil. One of the game's innovative features is its create-a-player mode. The game uses a battery-packed RAM in order to save progress.

Gameplay
Experience points are gained by doing well in holes. Power, accuracy, and luck are the only stats that can be powered-up by the player. Each player starts out with an experience level of 0 and with zero experience points. Certain golfers in the game do resemble those from real life PGA Tour professionals from the 1980s like Greg Norman.

There is only one golf course; which has some island holes in addition to trees and bunkers. A fanfare is performed when a player performs at par or better; the only other music track other than the title screen music. There is a digitized sound clip when a drive is delivered in a perfect fashion. Some of the holes have special awards where bonus amounts of experience points can be earned by either having the longest drive or achieving a hole in one.

The main menu allows players to choose between a practice session, a match play game, a stroke play match, and a pro tournament. In the pro tournament, the player can ask for advice on the best way to deal with an individual hole.

Reception
British magazine Computer and Video Games gave Golfamania an overall score of 89%. Console XS gave it an 82% score. Commodore Power Play gave the game a rating of 71%.

References

External links

1990 video games
Golf video games
Sanritsu Denki games
Sega video games
Master System games
Master System-only games
Video games developed in Japan